Boone Township, Arkansas may refer to:

 Boone Township, Logan County, Arkansas
 Boone Township, Union County, Arkansas

See also 
 List of townships in Arkansas
 Boone Township (disambiguation)

Arkansas township disambiguation pages